Lisa Fay Beatty (October 15, 1964 – November 25, 2011) was best known for her involvement in the band 7 Year Bitch.  She replaced the guitarist Roisin Dunne in 1997.  The band later broke up the same year. She was killed in a traffic collision in November 2011.

Lisa also toured with her band Mudwimin, she sound engineered for bands like The Gits, 7 Year Bitch, and Smoochknob. She is acknowledged in the thanks portion of the 2005 film The Gits as Lisa Fae Beatty (sic). Some list her as Lisa Faye Beatty but her own Facebook page spells her name Lisa Fay. She collaborated with numerous artists including Gossip, Sleepytime Gorilla Museum, and Iggy Pop.

Discography

Other Compilations
 "Damn Good And Well" on Rough Cuts: The Best Of Rough Trade Publishing, 1991–1995 (Rough Trade Publishing, 1997).
 "Rock-A-Bye Baby" on She's A Rebel (Beloved/Shanachie Records, 1997).
 "Shake Appeal" on We Will Fall: The Iggy Pop Tribute (Royalty Records, 1997).
 "M.I.A." on Whatever: The 90's Pop & Culture Box (Flying Rhino Records/WEA, 2005).
 "The Scratch" on Sleepless in Seattle: The Birth Of Grunge (LiveWire Recordings, 2006).

Filmography
 1995 Not Bad for a Girl: credited as Lisa Fay
 2005 The Gits: thanked as Lisa Fae Beatty (sic)

References

1964 births
2011 deaths
20th-century American women guitarists
20th-century American guitarists
Road incident deaths in California
21st-century American women